In photography and cinematography, available light (also called ambient light or practical light) refers to any available source of light that is not explicitly supplied by the photographer for the purpose of taking pictures. The term usually refers to light sources in the surrounding environment that are present naturally (e.g. sunlight, moonlight, starlight, etc.) or artificial lighting that are already pre-existing (e.g. street lights, room lights, etc.). It generally excludes flashes, although arguably flash lighting provided by other photographers shooting simultaneously in the same space could be considered available light. Light sources that affect the scene and are included in the actual frame are called practical light sources, or simply practicals.

Use of available light is an important factor in candid photography in order not to disturb the subjects.

The use of available light may pose a challenge for a photographer. The brightness and direction of the light is often not adjustable, except perhaps for indoor lighting. This will limit the selection of shutter speeds, and may require the use of shades or reflectors to manipulate the light. It can also influence the time, location, and even orientation of the photo shoot to obtain the desired lighting conditions. Available light can often also produce a color cast with color photography.

Levels of ambient light are most frequently considered relative to additional lighting used as fill light, in which case the ambient light is normally treated as the key light. In some cases, ambient light may be used as a fill, in which case additional lighting provides the stronger light source, for example in bounce flash photography. The relative intensity of ambient light and fill light is known as the lighting ratio, an important factor in calculating contrast in the finished image.

Generally, the technology of digital photography extended the range for available light photography strongly. While it is possible to make decent images of night scenes in streets or in rooms without flash even with the cameras of standard smartphones of 2022, this was virtually impossible with the former photographic film, with the only exception of highly sensitive black and white film which had various drawbacks.

Sources

Indoor 

 Candles
 Fluorescent lamps
 Lightbulbs
 Light shining in a window

Outdoor 

 The Aurora
 Clouds
 Fires
 Fireworks
 Flashlights (torches)
 Lanterns
 Light pollution
 Lightning
 The moon
 The sky
 Stars (very dim)
 Street lights
 The sun (see also golden hour)

See also 
Low-key lighting
High-key lighting
Illuminance
Lux

References 

Photographic techniques
Lighting
Cinematography
Science of photography